EFAF may refer to:
IFAF Europe
École Française Anatole France